Ingeborg Christiansen (born November 12, 1930) is a retired German film and television actress.

Selected filmography
 Professor Nachtfalter (1951)
 The Mosquito (1954)
 The Fisherman from Heiligensee (1955)
 The Forest House in Tyrol (1955)
 The Girl Without Pyjamas (1957)
 The Mad Bomberg (1957)
 The Time Has Come (1960, TV series)

References

Bibliography
 Richard Bertrand Dimmitt. An Actor Guide to the Talkies: A Comprehensive Listing of 8,000 Feature-length Films from January, 1949, Until December, 1964, Volume 1. Scarecrow Press, 1967.

External links

1930 births
Living people
German film actresses
German television actresses
Actresses from Hamburg